The Zekhring are from the Anjaw District (formerly part of Lohit district) of Arunachal Pradesh. They live in the hilly terrain and banks of the Lohit River in the Walong and Kibithoo area. As of 2002, their tribal population stood at 300, and their population included members of an ethnically akin tribe, the Meyor.

The Zekhring sustain their livelihoods through agriculture, and are Animists, although they have recently co-adopted Tibetan Buddhism. The Zekhring are culturally more akin to the Miju Mishmi than to the Tibetans in the north. Sungkhu, Tsotangpho Wangley, Tso Tangpo and Losar are their major festivals.

References

External links
 Ethnologue profile

Anjaw district